Craspedoxanthitea indistincta is a species of tephritid or fruit flies in the genus Craspedoxanthitea of the family Tephritidae.

References

Trypetinae